Bastardo is an Italian village and frazione (hamlet) of the municipality of Giano dell'Umbria, in the Province of Perugia, Umbria. As of 2011 its population was of 1,549.

Geography
Located in central Umbria in the valley of River Puglia, a tributary of the Tiber, at the altitude of 290 m (951 ft) above sea-level, Bastardo is 7 km far (about 4 mi) from Giano, 6 from Gualdo Cattaneo and 20 from Foligno. It is an agricultural products processing center that counts several hotels and restaurants, due to its location in a scenic area of Umbria.

History
The town grew around an inn and stabling station in the 17th or 18th century, and was once known as Osteria del Bastardo (i.e. "Bastard's Inn"). In the 1920s the toponym was shortened to its current form and, from 1933, a name change was suggested but it was never modified. Bastardo has been noted for its unusual place name.

Main sights
The Abbey of San Felice in Giano
The little church of Madonna del Pianto
The archaeological finds of a Roman villa in the locality of Toccioli

Gallery

References

External links

Bastardo (Thayer's Gazetteer of Umbria)

Frazioni of the Province of Perugia